Kahnow (also Romanized as Kahnow, Kahnoo, and Kahnū; also known as Kahnūk) is a village in Neh Rural District, in the Central District of Nehbandan County, South Khorasan Province, Iran. At the 2006 census, its population was 235, in 51 families.

References 

Populated places in Nehbandan County